Henry Baker College, Melukavu, is a Government of Kerala and University Grants Commission (India) aided arts and science Christian college in Melukavu, Kottayam, in Kerala, India. Established in 1981, it was named after missionary Henry Baker Jr. It is owned by the Diocese of East Kerala of the Church of South India and affiliated to Mahatma Gandhi University. It offers postgraduate courses (in commerce and history) and undergraduate courses (in commerce, physics, English and history).

See also
CMS College, Kottayam
Christian College, Kattakada

References

External links
Official site

Christian universities and colleges in India
Colleges in Kerala
Colleges affiliated to Mahatma Gandhi University, Kerala
Universities and colleges in Kottayam district
Educational institutions established in 1981
1981 establishments in Kerala